Santosh is a given name.

Santoshor Santhosh may refer to:

Places 
 Santosh, Bangladesh
 Santoshnagar, Hyderabad, India

Others 
 Santosh (film), 1989 Bollywood film
 Santosh Trophy, annual football tournament in India
 Santhosh (actor), Indian film actor

See also 
 Santos (disambiguation)